Santa Maria Assunta e San Martino is a neoclassical-style, Roman Catholic parish church located in Chiampo, province of Vicenza, region of Veneto, Italy.

History
A chapel at the site, dedicated to San Martino, is documented since the fourth centuries. Over the years the devotion the Virgin grew. By 1460, it was an arcipretale church with other dependant parishes. The church was rebuilt in the early 19th century, and completed in 1852. The interior has a sculpted late-gothic-style Ciborium.

References

Churches in the province of Vicenza
Neoclassical architecture in Veneto
19th-century Roman Catholic church buildings in Italy
Roman Catholic churches completed in 1852
1852 establishments in the Austrian Empire
Neoclassical church buildings in Italy